Joan de Giorgio Vitelli i Simon (Alghero 1870 - Rome 1916) was an Italian lawyer and writer. He was a supporter of Renaixença catalana in Alghero.

He worked for Ministry of the Interior (Italy) and became prefect in Ravenna in 1913.

In 1887 he helped the archaeologist Eduard Toda and he translated to Catalan language works by Dante Alighieri, Giacomo Leopardi and Giosuè Carducci.

1870 births
1916 deaths
People from Alghero
20th-century Italian lawyers
Translators to Catalan
Translators from Italian
19th-century translators
19th-century Italian male writers
19th-century Italian lawyers